The Since I Saw You Last Tour was a concert tour by British singer-songwriter Gary Barlow in support of his fourth studio album Since I Saw You Last. The tour saw Barlow play some of the biggest arenas in the UK and Ireland performing both Take That and his solo material from his career spanning two decades as well as his new material.

Background
Due to overwhelming demand, Barlow added a further four dates to the tour after the concert sold out less than 10 minutes after going on sale.

Opening acts
Eliza Doolittle

Set list
 "Opening" (Interlude)
 "Since I Saw You Last"
 "Greatest Day"
 "Candy"
 "Requiem"
 "Pray"
 "Shine" (with Eliza Doolittle)
 "A Million Love Songs"
 "Lie to Me"
 Acoustic Medley ("How Deep Is Your Love"/"Shame"/"So Help Me Girl")
 Swing Medley ("Sure"/"Everything Changes"/"Could It Be Magic")
 Ballads Medley ("Nobody Else"/"Love Ain't Here Anymore"/"Dying Inside"/"Said It All"/"The Garden"/"Forever Love")
 "Sing" (with a local school choir)
 "The Flood"
 "Face to Face"  (with Elton John on the screens)
 "Back for Good"
 "Relight My Fire"
 "Let Me Go"
 "Rule the World"
 "Jump"
 "Never Forget"

Tour dates

DVD release
A DVD of the tour entitled Since You Saw Him Last - The Tour was recorded from a sold-out arena performance at the Manchester Arena and was released on 15 December 2014 in the UK.

Reception
Reviews on the tour were largely positive. The Birmingham Mail commented positively saying "A thoroughly satisfactory evening's work, then, for one of Britain's most accomplished contemporary pop songwriters." with regional magazine, East Midlands Music, adding it was "a brilliant, entertaining evening".

Charts

References

2014 concert tours
Gary Barlow concert tours